Wang Zijie (born 15 July 1996) is a Chinese left-handed épée fencer. He competed in the men's team épée event at the 2020 Summer Olympics held in Tokyo, Japan.

References

Chinese male fencers
Chinese épée fencers
Olympic fencers of China
Fencers at the 2020 Summer Olympics
1996 births
Living people